Lei was an Italian entertainment television channel devoted to a female audiences, owned by Digicast and carried on SKY Italia.
Launched at 9:00 PM on January 25, 2009 with the film The Women, Lei'''s programming included films, TV series, debates and documentaries. The channel was shut down on 1 July 2020.

Programming
 30 Rock Afterlife Mistresses Profiler Socias Strictly Confidential The Bionic Woman The Practice The Real Housewives of New York City Veronica's Closet''

External links
 Lei official website 

RCS MediaGroup
Television channels in Italy
Television channels and stations established in 2009
2009 establishments in Italy
Italian-language television stations